Mark Cassidy (born 23 March 1985) is a former Irish professional cyclist who rode for the  team.

Major results

2011 – 
10th, Irish National Road Race Championship (CN)
40th overall, An Post Rás (2.2)
15th, Stage 2
79th overall, Tour of Oman (2.1)

2010 – 
3rd, Halfords Tour Series Dublin criterium
5th, Mere
6th overall, Suir Valley 3 Day
1st, KOM class
4th, Stage 1
20th, Beverbeek Classic (1.2)
28th, Rund um Köln (1.1)
42nd, Scheldeprijs (1.HC)
46th overall, FBD Insurance Ras (2.2)
1st, Stage 7
1st, Mountains class
4th, Stage 5
33rd, Stage 8

2009 – 
5th, Memorial Fred De Bruyne – Berlare
5th, Memorial Briek Schotte-Desselgem
13th, Irish National Road Race Championship (CN)
16th, Stage 5, Sachsen Tour (2.1)
99th overall, FBD Insurance Ras (2.2)
12th, Stage 8

2008 – 
34th overall, Tour of Ireland (2.1)

2007 – 
1st, Irish National U23 Road Race Championship (CN)
2nd, Grand Prix de Dourges-Hénin-Beaumont (1.2)
3rd, Irish National Road Race Championship (CN)
3rd, Stage 6, FBD Insurance Ras (2.2)

2006
3rd, Irish National U23 Road Race Championship (CN)
9th, Irish National Road Race Championship (CN)

2004
10th, Irish National Road Race Championship (CN)

References

External links
Irish Cycling Q&A
An Post-Sean Kelly Team – Official Website

Irish male cyclists
1985 births
Living people